The Companion Chronicles is a sci-fi audio series produced by Big Finish, detailing adventures usually featuring the Doctor, as told by various former companions of his, with only one further voice actor taking part in the narration. It began in 2007 as a mini-series of four stories about adventures of the first four Doctors (none of whom appeared in regular Big Finish audio plays, as William Hartnell, Patrick Troughton and Jon Pertwee died before they began and Tom Baker had declined to participate at that time ), but its popularity ensured that it returned for a second mini-series, and then in July 2008 releases became monthly. The monthly series of Companion Chronicles ended in June 2014 but the range has continued with box set releases, these releases focusing on adventures concerning the First and Second Doctors as narrated by their surviving companions.

Episodes
The character in brackets in the "Featuring" column is who the story is told by.

Series 1 (2007)

Series 2 (2007–08)

Series 3 (2008–09)

Series 4 (2009–10)

Series 5 (2010–11)

Specials (2011)

Series 6 (2011–12)

Special (2012)

Series 7 (2012–13)

Series 8 (2013–14)

Series 9: The First Doctor Volume 1 (2015)

Series 10: The Second Doctor Volume 1 (2016)

Series 11: The First Doctor Volume 2 (2017)

Series 12: The Second Doctor Volume 2 (2018)

Series 13: The First Doctor Volume 3 (2019)

Series 14: The Second Doctor Volume 3 (2022)

Awards and nominations

References

Audio plays based on Doctor Who
Big Finish Productions
Doctor Who spin-offs